Kanduleh (also Romanized as Kandūleh, in Kurdish: Kenüle, کەنۊلە) is a village in Kanduleh Rural District, Dinavar District, Sahneh County, Kermanshah Province, Iran. At the 2006 census, its population was 879, in 247 families.

References 

Populated places in Sahneh County